Viktor Götesson (born 14 July 1995) is a Swedish footballer who plays for AFC Eskilstuna as a forward.

References

External links

Viktor Götesson at Fotbolltransfers

1995 births
Living people
Association football forwards
Mjällby AIF players
IF Elfsborg players
Falkenbergs FF players
Degerfors IF players
AFC Eskilstuna players
Swedish footballers
Allsvenskan players
Superettan players